Bronislav Danda (10 January 1930 – 31 December 2015) was a Czech ice hockey player who competed in the 1952 Winter Olympics, in the 1956 Winter Olympics, and in the 1960 Winter Olympics. He was born in Hradec Králové, Czechoslovakia.

References

1930 births
2015 deaths
Czech ice hockey left wingers
Ice hockey players at the 1952 Winter Olympics
Ice hockey players at the 1956 Winter Olympics
Ice hockey players at the 1960 Winter Olympics
Olympic ice hockey players of Czechoslovakia
Sportspeople from Hradec Králové
Czechoslovak ice hockey left wingers